The Swamp (called Le Devin du faubourg/The Neighborhood Fortune-Teller in France) is a 1921 American silent drama film released by the Robertson-Cole Pictures Corporation and directed by Colin Campbell. The film was written and produced by Sessue Hayakawa, who also co-stars with Bessie Love. A print of this film is preserved at the Gosfilmofond archive in Moscow.

Plot 
Mary (Love) and her son Buster (Lee) live in a single room in a tenement in the slums of the city, having been deserted by their husband and father, wealthy Spencer Wellington (Tucker). While selling newspapers, Buster meets Wang (Hayakawa), a vegetable peddler. Wang protects Buster from attack, and receives a black eye in the endeavor. When Mary becomes ill, Wang cares for her until she is well. When Mary and Buster are about to be evicted, Wang sells his horse and vegetable stand to help them out, and he and Buster team up and become fortune-tellers.

Through Wang, Mary learns that her husband is planning to remarry. When Wang entertains at the wedding reception, he reveals Spencer's past, and Spencer's new fiance, society lady Norma Biddle (Wilson), ends the engagement. Mary obtains a divorce from Spencer, and marries the new rent collector Johnnie Rand (McCullough), who is a former sweetheart. Wang is able to retrieve his horse, and he returns to his homeland, where he is reunited with his sweetheart.

Cast 
 Sessue Hayakawa as Wang
 Bessie Love as Mary
 Janice Wilson as Norma Biddle
 Frankie Lee as Buster
 Lillian Langdon as Mrs. Biddle
 Harland Tucker as Spencer Wellington
 Ralph McCullough as Johnnie Rand

Reception 
The film received positive reviews, and Hayakawa and Love received praise for their performances.

References

External links 

 
 
 
 

1921 drama films
1921 films
American black-and-white films
Silent American drama films
American silent feature films
Film Booking Offices of America films
Films directed by Colin Campbell
Surviving American silent films
1920s American films